Ciprian Ilie Foiaș (20 July 1933 – 22 March 2020) was a Romanian-American mathematician. He was awarded the Norbert Wiener Prize in Applied Mathematics in 1995, for his contributions in operator theory.

Education and career 

Born in Reșița, Romania, Foias studied mathematics at the University of Bucharest.  He completed his dissertation in 1957, but was not allowed to defend his thesis by the Communist government until 1962. He received his doctorate in 1962 under supervision of Miron Nicolescu.

Foias defected to France following his lecture at the International Congress of Mathematicians in 1978.  He later emigrated to the United States.

Foias taught at his alma mater (1966–1979), Paris-Sud 11 University (1979–1983), and Indiana University (1983 until retirement). Beginning in 2000, he was a teacher and researcher at Texas A&M University, where he was a Distinguished Professor.

The Foias constant is named after him. Foias is listed as an ISI highly cited researcher.

Together with Sz-Nagy, Foias proved the celebrated commutant lifting theorem.

He died in Tempe, Arizona on March 22, 2020.

Publications 
 with Béla Szőkefalvi-Nagy: Harmonic analysis of operators on Hilbert Space. North Holland 1970 (Translated from the French; first edition: Masson 1967). 
 with Roger Temam, Oscar Manley, and Ricardo Rosa: Navier Stokes equations and Turbulence. Cambridge University Press, 2001.
 with Peter Constantin, Roger Temam: Attractors representing turbulent flows. American Mathematical Society, 1985.
 with Peter Constantin: Navier Stokes Equations. University of Chicago Press, 1988.
 with Hitay Özbay, Allen Tannenbaum: Robust control of infinite dimensional systems. Springer, 1995.
 with Hari Bercovici, Carl Pearcy: Dual algebras with applications to invariant subspaces and dilation theory. American Mathematical Society, 1985.
 with Ion Colojoară: Theory of generalized spectral operators. Gordon and Breach, 1968.
 with Peter Constantin, Roger Temam, and Basil Nicolaenko: Integral Manifolds and Inertial Manifolds for Dissipative Partial Differential Equations. Springer-Verlag, Applied Mathematical Sciences Series, volume 70, 1988.

See also
Attractor
Evolution equation

References

External links

1933 births
2020 deaths
People from Reșița
Romanian emigrants to the United States
University of Bucharest alumni
Indiana University faculty
Texas A&M University faculty
20th-century Romanian mathematicians
21st-century Romanian mathematicians
Academic staff of Paris-Sud University
Operator theorists